Horseshoe Lake may refer to:

Canada
Horseshoe Lake, Alberta
Horseshoe Lake (Pipestone River, Ontario), a lake downstream from the Frog Rapids on the Pipestone River in Kenora District, Ontario
Horseshoe Lake, a community in Seguin Township, Ontario

New Zealand
Horseshoe Lake (New Zealand), a list of lakes

United States
Alaska
Horseshoe Lake, Alaska, where the remains of murder victim "Horseshoe Harriet" were found
Arizona
Horseshoe Lake, Arizona
Arkansas
Horseshoe Lake, Arkansas
Horseshoe Lake (Dallas County, Arkansas), a lake in Dallas County, Arkansas
California
Horseshoe Lake, a lake in Bidwell Park, Chico
 Horseshoe Lake (Mono County, California)
 Horseshoe Lake (Shasta County, California)
Illinois
Horseshoe Lake (Alexander County, Illinois)
Horseshoe Lake (Madison County, Illinois)
Minnesota
Horseshoe Lake, a lake in Brown County, Minnesota
Horseshoe Lake (Chisago County, Minnesota)
Horseshoe Lake (Douglas County, Minnesota)
Horseshoe Lake (Isanti County, Minnesota)
Murphy Lake (Itasca County, Minnesota) or Horseshoe Lake
Horseshoe Lake, a lake in Le Sueur County, Minnesota
Horseshoe Lake, a lake in Scott County, Minnesota
Horseshoe Lake (Todd County, Minnesota)
Little Horseshoe Lake, a lake in Chisago County
Montana
Horseshoe Lake, a lake in Beaverhead County, Montana
Horseshoe Lake, a lake in Cascade County, Montana
Horseshoe Lake, a lake in Phillips County, Montana
Horseshoe Lake, a lake in Roosevelt County, Montana
Horseshoe Lake, a lake in Sheridan County, Montana
Horseshoe Lake, a lake in Sweet Grass County, Montana
New York
Horseshoe Lake (St. Lawrence County, New York)
Texas
Horseshoe Lake, a lake in Brazos Bend State Park, Fort Bend County
Horseshoe Lake, south of Port Bolivar, north of Bolivar Point Lighthouse and Fort Travis, on the Bolivar Peninsula
Washington
Horseshoe Lake (Washington)

See also
 Oxbow lake